The Golden Globe Award for Best Supporting Actress – Motion Picture is a Golden Globe Award that was first awarded by the Hollywood Foreign Press Association in 1944 for a performance in a motion picture released in the previous year.

The formal title has varied since its inception; since 2005, the award has officially been called "Best Performance by an Actress in a Supporting Role in a Motion Picture".

Winners and nominees

1940s

Miriam Hopkins - The Heiress

1950s

1960s

1970s

1980s

1990s

2000s

2010s

2020s

Multiple nominations

5 nominations
 Lee Grant
 Maureen Stapleton
 Meryl Streep

4 nominations
 Amy Adams
 Kate Winslet
 Shelley Winters

3 nominations
 Kathy Bates
 Cate Blanchett
 Cameron Diaz
 Mildred Dunnock
 Nicole Kidman
 Diane Ladd
 Thelma Ritter
 Julia Roberts
 Octavia Spencer
 Dianne Wiest

2 nominations
 Ann-Margret
 Kim Basinger
 Karen Black
 Joan Blondell
 Sonia Braga
 Geraldine Chaplin
 Jessica Chastain
 Cher
 Penélope Cruz
 Viola Davis
 Judi Dench
 Kirsten Dunst
 Jane Fonda
 Jodie Foster
 Hermione Gingold
 Ruth Gordon
 Barbara Hershey
 Anjelica Huston
 Madeline Kahn

 Shirley Knight
 Shirley MacLaine
 Frances McDormand
 Helen Mirren
 Julianne Moore
 Agnes Moorehead
 Geraldine Page
 Natalie Portman
 Vanessa Redgrave
 Winona Ryder
 Lilia Skala
 Maggie Smith
 Mary Steenburgen
 Emma Stone
 Marisa Tomei
 Brenda Vaccaro
 Lesley Ann Warren
 Sigourney Weaver
 Rachel Weisz
 Michelle Williams

Multiple winners
2 wins
 Karen Black
 Ruth Gordon
 Angela Lansbury
 Agnes Moorehead
 Meryl Streep
 Kate Winslet

See also
 Academy Award for Best Supporting Actress
 BAFTA Award for Best Actress in a Supporting Role
 Independent Spirit Award for Best Supporting Female
 Critics' Choice Movie Award for Best Supporting Actress
 Screen Actors Guild Award for Outstanding Performance by a Female Actor in a Supporting Role

References

Golden Globe Awards
 
Film awards for supporting actress